Newstead is an unincorporated community in Christian County, in the U.S. state of Kentucky.

History
Newstead had its start when the railroad was extended to that point. A post office called Newstead was established in 1847, and remained in operation until 1906.

References

Unincorporated communities in Christian County, Kentucky
Unincorporated communities in Kentucky